Joaquim Albino,  known as Quincas (23 January 1931, Rio de Janeiro), is a former association player from Brazil who played on the left wing. In the first half of the 1950s he played for Fluminense FC of Rio de Janeiro, with which he won the Championship of Rio de Janeiro of 1951 and the  Copa Rio, a highly regarded international tournament in its day, of 1952.

Clubs
 1948-49: Canto do Rio FC
 1950-56: Fluminense FC  (167 matches / 59 goals)
 1957: SE Palmeiras (19 matches / 5 goals)

Honours
 Championship of Rio de Janeiro: 1951
 Copa Rio: 1952
 top scorer of the Taça da Prefeitura do Distrito Federal of 1951 with 8 goals.

References 

 Qincas, Estatísticas Fluminense.
 Wagner Luiz Marques: Sociedade Esportiva Palmeiras: o time do todos os tempos, Cianorte, Paraná, 2012, p. 355.

1931 births
Fluminense FC players
Sociedade Esportiva Palmeiras players
Living people
Brazilian footballers
Association football wingers
Sportspeople from Rio de Janeiro (state)